Karanda may refer to:

Karanda (band), a dance music group
Karanda, Iran, a village in Iran
Karanda (shrub), a plant